Smithville, Indiana may refer to the following places:

Smithville, Monroe County, Indiana
Smithville, Owen County, Indiana